The Grinning Face (German:Das grinsende Gesicht), aka The Man Who Laughs, is a 1921 Austrian-German silent horror film directed by Julius Herska and starring Franz Höbling, Nora Gregor and Lucienne Delacroix. It is an adaptation of the 1869 novel The Man Who Laughs by Victor Hugo.

The film was later remade by Paul Leni in 1928 as The Man Who Laughs, which starred Conrad Veidt in the Gwynplaine role.

Plot
In the late 17th century in France, the young son of a widowed lord is kidnapped by gypsies, who carve a permanent grin on the child's face. When the disfigured youth (Franz Hobling) grows up, he falls in love with a blind girl named Dea (Lucienne Delacroix), and joins a touring company as a performer. Calling himself Gwynplaine, he develops an act in which he reveals his hideous face to the crowds for money. A sexually perverse, seductive socialite named Josiane becomes attracted to him and seeks to possess him. He later learns he is heir to a fortune, but chooses instead to remain with his adopted family.

Cast
 Franz Höbling as Gwynplaine 
 Nora Gregor as Herzogin Josiane 
 Lucienne Delacroix as Dea 
 Anna Kallina as Queen Anne of England 
 Eugen Jensen as Barkilphedro 
 Armin Seydelmann as Lord Bolinbroke 
 Franz Weißmüller as Ursus 
 Jimmy Court as Lord David Dirry-Moir 
 Josef Moser as King James II of England 
 Robert Balajthy as Lord Linäus Claincharlie 
 Susanne Osten as Lady Dirry-Moir 
 Arped Kramer as Dr. Gerardus 
 Fritz Strassny as Dr. Hardqusnonne

References

Bibliography
 Prince, Stephen. The Horror Film. Rutgers University Press, 2004.

External links

1921 films
1920s historical horror films
Austrian silent feature films
Austrian historical horror films
Films based on French novels
Films based on works by Victor Hugo
Films set in the 17th century
Films set in London
Cultural depictions of Anne, Queen of Great Britain
Austrian black-and-white films
Films directed by Julius Herska
1921 horror films
Silent horror films
1920s German-language films
Cultural depictions of James II of England